Michale Kyser (born November 26, 1991) is an American professional basketball player for Surne Bilbao Basket of the Liga ACB and the Basketball Champions League. He played college basketball for Louisiana Tech.

High school career
Kyser played high school basketball for Lancaster High School, in Lancaster, Texas, and at Christian Life Center Academy in Humble, Texas.

College career
In his senior year, Kyser led Louisiana Tech to the National Invitation Tournament quarterfinals, where they lost to Temple. He also helped the team win the conference regular season championship in 2013, 2014, and 2015. In the 2014–15 season, he became the all-time career blocks leader at Louisiana Tech.

Professional career

After going undrafted in the 2015 NBA draft, Kyser joined the Toronto Raptors for the 2015 NBA Summer League. He appeared in four games playing for the Raptors in Las Vegas and averaged 3.5 points and 4.0 rebounds in 14.6 minutes per game. On July 23, 2015, he signed with the Raptors, only to be waived by the team on October 24 after appearing in one preseason game. On October 31, he signed with the Raptors 905 as an affiliate player.

On August 30, 2016, Kyser signed with Tadamon Zouk of the Lebanese Basketball League, however, he left the team before playing for them and signed with the Salt Lake City Stars on November 25. The next day, he made his debut for the Stars in a 117–84 loss to the Texas Legends, recording eight points, two rebounds and one assist in 15 minutes off the bench. On March 3, 2017, Kyser was waived by the Stars.

On September 23, 2017, Kyser joined Enosis Neon Paralimni of the Cypriot League where he would average 15 points, 14 rebounds and 3 blocks per game. On November 29, 2017, he left Enosis in order to join Kymis of the Greek Basket League. During the season, he led the league in blocks with 1.9 blocks per game. He subsequently spent the 2018–19 season with Greek club Aris Thessaloniki. In July 2019, Kyser signed with the Guelph Nighthawks of the Canadian Elite Basketball League.

On October 26, 2019, Kyser was drafted 10th overall by the Lakeland Magic of the NBA G League. He averaged 9.0 points and 5.8 rebounds in 26.2 minutes per game. Kyser was waived on March 10, 2020. On July 31, he signed with VEF Rīga of the Latvian–Estonian Basketball League. Kyser averaged 10.5 points and 7.9 rebounds per game.

On July 15, 2021, he signed with Hapoel Holon of the Israeli Basketball Premier League.

On July 13, 2022, he signed with Surne Bilbao Basket of the Liga ACB and the Basketball Champions League.

Career statistics

|-
| align="left" | 2011–12
| align="left" | Louisiana Tech
| 33 || 2 || 13.5 || .463 || .000 || .500 || 2.6 || .2 || .4 || 1.8 || 3.7
|-
| align="left" | 2012–13
| align="left" | Louisiana Tech
| 34 || 33 || 19.3 || .479 || .000 || .623 || 5.3 || .6 || .6 || 2.7 || 5.0
|-
| align="left" | 2013–14
| align="left" | Louisiana Tech
| 36 || 34 || 23.3 || .571 || .000 || .500 || 6.6 || .4 || .5 || 3.0 || 7.0
|-
| align="left" | 2014–15
| align="left" | Louisiana Tech
| 36 || 35 || 28.4 || .605 || .000 || .606 || 6.6 || .4 || .6 || 2.8 || 8.6
|-
| align="left" | Career
| align="left" | 
| 139 || 104 || 21.3 || .543 || .000 || .558 || 5.3 || .4 || .5 || 2.6 || 6.2

References

External links
Eurobasket.com Profile
Greek Basket League Profile 
2015 NBA Summer League profile
Louisiana Tech Bulldogs bio

1991 births
Living people
21st-century African-American sportspeople
African-American basketball players
American expatriate basketball people in Canada
American expatriate basketball people in Cyprus
American expatriate basketball people in Greece
American expatriate basketball people in Latvia
American expatriate basketball people in Spain
American men's basketball players
Aris B.C. players
Basketball players from Texas
Bilbao Basket players
Centers (basketball)
Guelph Nighthawks players
Hapoel Holon players
Kymis B.C. players
Lakeland Magic players
Liga ACB players
Louisiana Tech Bulldogs basketball players
People from Victoria, Texas
Raptors 905 players
Salt Lake City Stars players